Jonathan Edward Schell (August 21, 1943 – March 25, 2014) was an American author and visiting fellow at Yale University, whose work primarily dealt with campaigning against nuclear weapons.

Personal
Schell was born in New York City on August 21, 1943, to Orville Hickock Schell Jr., a lawyer who chaired Human Rights Watch, and Marjorie Bertha. He studied at Dalton School in New York and The Putney School in Vermont, later on graduating from Harvard University in 1965, in Far Eastern history. Then he spent a year learning Japanese at the International Christian University in Tokyo.

He was the brother of Suzanne Schell Pearce, of Cambridge, Massachusetts, and Orville Schell, former Dean of the University of California, Berkeley Graduate School of Journalism. and current Arthur Ross Director of the Center on U.S.-China Relations at Asia Society in New York. He was a graduate of The Putney School in Putney, Vermont.

Jonathan Schell died at age 70, on March 25, 2014 at his home in Brooklyn, with a cancer caused by an underlying blood condition that may have been caused by Agent Orange. His last years were spent in research on climate change for an unwritten book he titled The Human Shadow.

Career
Schell wrote The Village of Ben Suc when he stopped at Vietnam in 1966, en route back to the United States from Tokyo. The book started as a series of articles in the New Yorker. At just 24, he managed a press pass to Saigon from The Harvard Crimson, whose correspondents helped him to cover the war. He wrote: "Faithful to the initial design, Air Force jets sent their bombs down on the deserted ruins, scorching again the burned foundations of the houses and pulverizing for a second time the heaps of rubble, in the hope of collapsing tunnels too deep and well hidden for the bulldozers to crush—as though, having decided to destroy it, we were now bent on annihilating every possible indication that the village of Ben Suc had ever existed."

His next book, The Military Half: An Account of Destruction in Quang Ngai and Quang Tin, published in 1968, also drew a graphic picture of the devastating effects of American bombings and ground operations on Quảng Ngãi Province and Quảng Tín Province in South Vietnam, as he was a witness to Operation Cedar Falls, writing particularly on the destruction of Ben Suc.

His work appeared in The Nation, The New Yorker, and TomDispatch.  The Fate of the Earth received the Los Angeles Times Book Prize, among other awards, and was nominated for the Pulitzer Prize, the National Book Award, and the National Critics Award.
In his words ; "Never has a nation unleashed so much violence with so little risk to itself. It is the government's way of waging war without the support of its own people, and involves us all in the dishonor of killing in a cause we are no longer willing to die for."

From 1967 until 1987, he was a staff writer at The New Yorker, where he served as the principal writer of the magazine's Notes and Comment section. He was a columnist for Newsday from 1990 until 1996. He taught at many universities, including Princeton, Emory, New York University, the New School, Wesleyan University and the Yale Law School. At the time of his death he was a visiting lecturer at Yale College.

In the early 1980s, Schell wrote a series of articles in The New Yorker (subsequently published in 1982 as The Fate of the Earth), which were instrumental in raising public awareness about the dangers of the nuclear arms race. He became a persistent advocate for disarmament and a world free of nuclear weapons.

In 1987, he was a fellow at the Institute of Politics at the John F. Kennedy School of Government and in 2002, a fellow at the Kennedy School's Shorenstein Center on the Press, Politics, and Public Policy. In 2003, he was a visiting lecturer at Yale Law School, and in 2005, a Distinguished Visiting Fellow at Yale's Center for the Study of Globalization.

From 1998 to his death in 2014 he was a Senior Fellow at The Nation Institute and the Peace and Disarmament Correspondent for The Nation magazine.

In 2002 and 2003, Schell was a persistent critic of the invasion of Iraq. He later commented, "There doesn't seem to be a rush to find the people who were right about Iraq and install them in the mainstream media."

He won George Polk Awards in 1976 and also published essays on the Presidency of Richard Nixon, as well as the aftermath to the Watergate scandal, which led to the president's resignation in 1974,  forming the basis to his book, The Time of Illusion.

Reviews, response, and criticism
In 1967, John Mecklin wrote in The New York Times that The Village of Ben Suc, Jonathan Schell's first book, was "written with a skill that many a veteran war reporter will envy, eloquently sensitive, subtly clothed in an aura of detachment, understated, extraordinarily persuasive."

Reviewing The Military Half: An Account of Destruction in Quang Ngai and Quang Tin, journalist and historian Jonathan Mirsky wrote in The Nation: "I know no book which has made me angrier and more ashamed."

On its publication in 1982, The Fate of the Earth was described by Kai Erikson in The New York Times as "a work of enormous force" and "an event of profound historical moment.... [I]n the end, it accomplishes what no other work has managed to do in the 37 years of the nuclear age. It compels us - and compel is the right word - to confront head on the nuclear peril in which we all find ourselves." The book also reflected on the end of love, politics and art, and annihilation of humans as a species. CBS newsman Walter Cronkite called the book "one of the most important works of recent years", which made this book on nuclear disarmament, a commercial success.

Writing in Foreign Affairs magazine, however, David Greenberg called The Fate of the Earth an "overwrought doomsday polemic." Two decades later, in Slate.com, Michael Kinsley characterized it as "an overheated stew of the obvious and the idiotic" and suggested it was "the silliest book ever taken seriously by serious people." The Los Angeles Times noted that "some reviewers found Schell's book shrill and overstated."

Reviewing The Seventh Decade: The New Shape of Nuclear Danger in The New York Times in 2007, Martin Walker characterized it as "a passionate and cogently argued case for the complete abolition of nuclear weapons.... There is little in Schell's book that is new, but his careful assembly of the available evidence will scare the pants off most readers. And so it should."

The New Yorker editorship succession controversy
In 1977, William Shawn, the longtime editor-in-chief of The New Yorker magazine, designated Schell as his chosen successor to replace him but he was forced to rescind that plan as it proved immediately unpopular with the magazine's staff.    Shawn revisited the same plan in 1982 but again withdrew Schell's name from consideration in the face of a staff revolt.  Ultimately, upon a change of ownership of the magazine in 1987, Shawn was removed and replaced as editor-in-chief with Robert Gottlieb.

Bibliography

 
 
 The Military Half: An Account of Destruction in Quang Ngai and Quang Tin (1968)
 Comment on the Pentagon Papers (June 26, 1971)
 Comment on America's growing cynicism (January 21, 1974)
 The Time of Illusion (1976)
 Comment on the A.C.L.U.'s defense of a neo-Nazi march in Skokie, Illinois (August 21, 1978)
 The Fate of the Earth (February 1, 1982)
 Comment on the role of "obsession" in American foreign policy (May 14, 1984)
 The Abolition (1984)
 Comment on Iran-Contra (January 26, 1987) 
 History in Sherman Park (1987)
 The Real War (1988)
 Observing the Nixon Years (1989)
 
 The Gift of Time: The Case for Abolishing Nuclear Weapons Now (1998)
 The Unfinished Twentieth Century (2001)
 The Unconquerable World: Power, Nonviolence, and the Will of the People (2003),
 A Hole in the World (2004)
 The Jonathan Schell Reader: On the United States at War, the Long Crisis of the American Republic, and the Fate of the Earth (2006)
 The Seventh Decade: The New Shape of Nuclear Danger (2007)

See also
Michio Kaku
Helen Caldicott
List of peace activists

References

External links 

Biography from the Yale Center for the Study of Globalization
Biography from The Globalist
Smoking Guns and Mushroom Clouds

 

1943 births
2014 deaths
20th-century American essayists
21st-century American essayists
American anti–nuclear weapons activists
American non-fiction environmental writers
American people of German descent
The Atlantic (magazine) people
Harvard University alumni
The New Yorker staff writers
The Putney School alumni
Wesleyan University faculty